Kent is a county in South East England and one of the home counties. It borders Greater London to the northwest, Surrey to the west and East Sussex to the southwest, and Essex to the north across the estuary of the River Thames; it faces the French department of Pas-de-Calais across the Strait of Dover. The county town is Maidstone. It is the fifth most populous county in England, the most populous non-metropolitan county and the most populous of the home counties.

Kent was one of the first British territories to be settled by Germanic tribes, most notably the Jutes, following the withdrawal of the Romans. Canterbury Cathedral in Kent, the oldest cathedral in England, has been the seat of the Archbishops of Canterbury since the conversion of England to Christianity that began in the 6th century with Saint Augustine. Rochester Cathedral in Medway is England's second-oldest cathedral. Located between London and the Strait of Dover, which separates England from mainland Europe, Kent has been the setting for both conflict and diplomacy, including the Battle of Britain in World War II and the Leeds Castle peace talks of 1978 and 2004.

England relied on the county's ports to provide warships through much of its history; the Cinque Ports in the 10th–14th centuries and Chatham Dockyard in the 16th–20th centuries were of particular importance. France can be seen clearly in fine weather from Folkestone and the White Cliffs of Dover. Hills in the form of the North Downs and the Greensand Ridge span the length of the county and in the Vale of Holmesdale in between and to the south are most of the county's 26 castles.

Kent's economy is diversified: agriculture, haulage, logistics and tourism are various industries. Because of its orchards and allotments, Kent is known as "The Garden of England". In northwest Kent, industries include extraction of aggregate building materials, printing and scientific research. Coal mining has also played its part in Kent's industrial heritage. Large parts of Kent are within the London commuter belt and its strong transport connections to the capital and the nearby continent make Kent a high-income county. Twenty-eight per cent of the county forms part of two Areas of Outstanding Natural Beauty: the North Downs and The High Weald.

Etymology

The name Kent is believed to be of British Celtic origin. The meaning has been explained as 'coastal district,' 'corner-land' or 'land on the edge' (compare Welsh cant 'bordering of a circle, tire, edge;' Breton cant 'circle;' Dutch kant 'side, edge'). In Latin sources the area is called Cantia or Cantium, while the Anglo-Saxons referred to it as Cent, Cent lond or Centrice.

History

The area has been occupied since the Palaeolithic era, as attested by finds from the quarries at Swanscombe. The Medway megaliths were built during the Neolithic era. There is a rich sequence of Bronze Age, celtic Iron Age, and Britto-Roman era occupation, as indicated by finds and features such as the Ringlemere gold cup and the Roman villas of the Darent valley.

Julius Caesar described the area as Cantium, or the home of the Cantiaci, in 51 BC. The extreme west of the modern county was by the time of Roman Britain occupied by a celtic Iron Age tribe known as the Regni. Caesar wrote that the people of Kent were 'by far the most civilised inhabitants of Britain'.

Following the withdrawal of the Romans, large numbers of Germanic speakers from the continent settled in Kent, bringing their language, which came to be Old English. While they expelled the native Romano-British population, some likely remained in the area, eventually assimilating with the newcomers. Of the invading tribes, the Jutes were the most prominent, and the area became a Jutish kingdom recorded as Cantia in about 730 and Cent in 835. The early medieval inhabitants of the county were referred to as the Cantwara, or Kentish people. The city of Canterbury was the largest in Kent.

In 597, Pope Gregory I appointed the religious missionary (who became Saint Augustine of Canterbury after his death) as the first Archbishop of Canterbury. In the previous year, Augustine successfully converted the pagan King Æthelberht of Kent to Christianity. The Diocese of Canterbury became England's first Episcopal See with first cathedral and has since remained England's centre of Christianity. The second designated English cathedral was for West Kent at Rochester Cathedral.

Kent was traditionally partitioned into East and West Kent, and into lathes and hundreds. The traditional border of East and West Kent was the county's main river, the Medway. Men and women from east of the Medway are Men (or Maids) of Kent, those from the west are Kentishmen or Kentish Maids. The divide has been explained by some as originating in the Anglo-Saxon migrations, with Jutes mainly settling east of the Medway and Saxons settling west of it.

In the 11th century, the people of Kent adopted the motto Invicta, meaning "undefeated" or "unconquered". This naming followed the invasion of Britain by William of Normandy as he was unable to subdue the county and they negotiated favourable terms. The continued resistance of the Kentish people against the Normans led to Kent's designation as a semi-autonomous county palatine in 1067. Under the nominal rule of William's half-brother Odo of Bayeux, the county was granted similar powers to those granted in the areas bordering Wales and Scotland.

During the medieval and early modern period, Kent played a major role in several of England's most notable rebellions, including the Peasants' Revolt of 1381, led by Wat Tyler,
Jack Cade's Kent rebellion of 1450, and Wyatt's Rebellion of 1554 against Queen Mary I.

The Royal Navy first used the River Medway in 1547. By the reign of Elizabeth I (1558–1603) a small dockyard had been established at Chatham. By 1618, storehouses, a ropewalk, a drydock, and houses for officials had been built downstream from Chatham.

By the 17th century, tensions between Britain and the powers of the Netherlands and France led to increasing military build-up in the county. Forts were built all along the coast following the raid on the Medway, a successful attack by the Dutch navy on the shipyards of the Medway towns in 1667.

The 18th century was dominated by wars with France, during which the Medway became the primary base for a fleet that could act along the Dutch and French coasts. When the theatre of operation moved to the Atlantic, this role was assumed by Portsmouth and Plymouth, with Chatham concentrating on shipbuilding and ship repair.  As an indication of the area's military importance, the first Ordnance Survey map ever drawn was a one-inch map of Kent, published in 1801. Many of the Georgian naval buildings still stand.

In the early 19th century, smugglers were very active on the Kent coastline. Gangs such as The Aldington Gang brought spirits, tobacco and salt to the county, and transported goods such as wool across the sea to France.

In 1889, the County of London was created and took over responsibility for local administration of parts of north-west Kent. These included the towns of Greenwich, Woolwich, Lee, Eltham, Charlton, Kidbrooke. In 1900, however, Kent absorbed the district of Penge. Some of Kent is contiguous with the Greater London sprawl, notably parts of Dartford.

Originally, the border between Kent and Sussex (later East Sussex) ran through the towns of Tunbridge Wells and Lamberhurst. In 1894, by the Local Government Act, the parts of these towns that lay in East Sussex were absorbed by Kent.

During the Second World War, much of the Battle of Britain was fought in the skies over Kent.

Between June 1944 and March 1945, more than 10,000 V1 flying bombs, or "Doodlebugs", were fired towards London from bases in Northern France. Although many were destroyed by aircraft, anti-aircraft guns and barrage balloons, both London and Kent were hit by around 2,500 of these bombs.

After the war, Kent's borders changed several more times. In 1965, the London boroughs of Bromley and Bexley were created from nine towns formerly in Kent. In 1998, Rochester, Chatham, Gillingham and Rainham left the administrative county of Kent to form the Unitary Authority of Medway. Plans for another unitary authority in north-west Kent were dropped, but in 2016 consultations began between five Kent local authorities (Canterbury, Thanet, Dover, Folkestone & Hythe, and Ashford) with a view to forming a new unitary authority for East Kent, outside the auspices of Kent County Council.

For almost nine centuries, a small part of present-day East London (the North Woolwich, London E16 area), formed part of Kent.

Geography 

Kent is in the southeastern corner of England. It borders the Thames Estuary and the North Sea to the north, and the Straits of Dover and the English Channel to the south.

The major geographical features of the county are based on a series of ridges and valleys running east–west across the county. These are the results of erosion of the Wealden dome, a dome across Kent and Sussex created by alpine movements 20–10 million years ago. This dome consists of an upper layer of chalk above successive layers of Upper Greensand, Gault Clay, Lower Greensand, Weald Clay, and Wealden sandstone. The ridges and valleys formed when the exposed clay eroded faster than the exposed chalk, greensand, or sandstone.

Sevenoaks, Maidstone, Ashford, and Folkestone are built on greensand, while Tonbridge and Tunbridge Wells are built on sandstone. Dartford, Gravesend, the Medway towns, Sittingbourne, Faversham, Canterbury, Deal, and Dover are built on chalk. The easterly section of the Wealden dome has been eroded away by the sea, and cliffs such as the White Cliffs of Dover are present where a chalk ridge known as the North Downs meets the coast. Spanning Dover and Westerham is the Kent Downs Area of Outstanding Natural Beauty.

The Wealden dome is a Mesozoic structure lying on a Palaeozoic foundation, which can often create the right conditions for coal formation. This is found in East Kent roughly between Deal, Canterbury, and Dover. They occur in two major troughs, which extend under the English Channel.

Seismic activity has occasionally been recorded in Kent, though the epicentres were offshore. In 1382 and 1580 there were two earthquakes exceeding 6.0 on the Richter Scale. In 1776, 1950, and on 28 April 2007 there were earthquakes of around 4.3. The 2007 earthquake caused physical damage in Folkestone. A further quake on 22 May 2015 measured 4.2 on the Richter Scale. It was centred in the Sandwich area of east Kent at about ten miles below the surface. There was little if any damage reported.

The coastline of Kent is continuously changing, due to tectonic uplift and coastal erosion. Until about 960, the Isle of Thanet was an island, separated by the Wantsum channel, formed around a deposit of chalk; over time, the channels silted up with alluvium. Similarly Romney Marsh and Dungeness have been formed by accumulation of alluvium.

Kent's principal river, the River Medway, rises near East Grinstead in Sussex and flows eastwards to Maidstone. Here it turns north and breaks through the North Downs at Rochester, then joins the estuary of the River Thames near Sheerness. The river is tidal as far as Allington lock, but in earlier times, cargo-carrying vessels reached as far upstream as Tonbridge. The Medway has captured the head waters of other rivers such as the River Darent. Other rivers of Kent include the River Stour in the east.

A 2014 study found that Kent shares significant reserves of shale oil with other neighbouring counties, totalling 4.4 billion barrels of oil, which then Business and Energy Minister Michael Fallon said "will bring jobs and business opportunities" and significantly help with UK energy self-sufficiency. Fracking in the area is required to achieve these objectives; it has been opposed by environmental groups.

Climate 
Kent is one of the warmest parts of Britain. On 10 August 2003, in the hamlet of Brogdale near Faversham the temperature reached , at that time the highest temperature ever officially recorded in the United Kingdom.

Governance 
Kent County Council (KCC) and its 12 district councils administer most of the county (3352 km2), while the Medway Towns Council, a unitary authority and commonly called Medway Council, administers the more densely populated remainder (192 km2). Together they have around 300 town and parish councils. Kent County Council's headquarters are in Maidstone, while Medway's offices are at Gun Wharf, Chatham.

At the 2013 county council elections, control of Kent County Council was held by the Conservatives, who won 44 of the council's 83 seats. 17 seats were won by the United Kingdom Independence Party, 13 by the Labour Party, 7 by the Liberal Democrats, 1 by the Green Party and 1 by the Swanscombe and Greenhithe Residents Association. At the 2007 local elections, control of Medway Council was held by the Conservatives; 33 of the council's 55 seats were held by the Conservatives, 13 by the Labour Party, 8 by the Liberal Democrats and 1 by an Independent. All but one of Kent's district councils are controlled by the Conservatives: a minority Labour administration took control of Thanet District in December 2011 after a Conservative councillor defected to the Independent group. In the council elections of May 2015 the United Kingdom Independence Party (UKIP) took control of the Council, the first and so far only one in the UK. In October 2015 UKIP lost overall control following a series of resignations, although remaining the largest party, only for UKIP to regain control once more following ward elections in August 2016.

At the national level, Kent is represented in Parliament by 17 MPs, all of whom are Conservative except Rosie Duffield, Labour MP for Canterbury since 2017.

Demography

At the 2011 census, Kent, including Medway, had 1,727,665 residents (18.0% of which in Medway); had 711,847 households (17.5% of which in Medway) and had 743,436 dwellings (14.8% of which in Medway). 51.1% of Kent's population excluding Medway was female — as to Medway, this proportion was 50.4%.

The tables below provide statistics for the administrative county of Kent, that is, excluding Medway.

Economy

At the 2001 UK census, employment statistics for the residents in Kent, including Medway, were as follows: 41.1% in full-time employment, 12.4% in part-time employment, 9.1% self-employed, 2.9% unemployed, 2.3% students with jobs, 3.7% students without jobs, 12.3% retired, 7.3% looking after home or family, 4.3% permanently sick or disabled, and 2.7% economically inactive for other reasons. Of residents aged 16–74, 16% had a higher education qualification or the equivalent, compared to 20% nationwide.

The average hours worked per week by residents of Kent were 43.1 for males and 30.9 for females. Their industry of employment was 17.3% retail, 12.4% manufacturing, 11.8% real estate, 10.3% health and social work, 8.9% construction, 8.2% transport and communications, 7.9% education, 6.0% public administration and defence, 5.6% finance, 4.8% other community and personal service activities, 4.1% hotels and restaurants, 1.6% agriculture, 0.8% energy and water supply, 0.2% mining, and 0.1% private households. This is higher than the whole of England for construction and transport/communications and lower for manufacturing.

Kent is sometimes known as the "Garden of England" for its abundance of orchards and hop gardens. In particular the county produces tree-grown fruits, strawberries and hazelnuts. Distinctive hop-drying buildings called oasts are common in the countryside, although many have been converted into dwellings. Nearer to London, market gardens also flourish. Kent is the main area for hazelnut production in the UK.

However, in recent years, there has been a significant drop in agriculture, and industry and services are increasing their utilisation of the area. This is illustrated by the following table of economic indicator gross value added (GVA) between 1995 and 2003 (figures are in £ millions):

North Kent is heavily industrialised, with cement-making at Northfleet and Cuxton, brickmaking at Sittingbourne, shipbuilding on the Medway and Swale, engineering and aircraft design and construction at Rochester, chemicals at Dartford, papermaking at Swanley, and oil refining at Grain. There is a steel mini mill in Sheerness and a rolling mill in Queenborough. There are two nuclear power stations at Dungeness, although the older one, Dungeness A, built in 1965, was decommissioned in 2006.

Cement-making, papermaking, and coal-mining were important industries in Kent during the 19th and 20th centuries. Cement came to the fore in the 19th century when massive building projects were undertaken. The ready supply of chalk and huge pits between Stone and Gravesend bear testament to that industry. There were also other workings around Burham on the tidal Medway. Chalk, gravel and clay were excavated on Dartford Heath for centuries.

Kent's original paper mills stood on streams like the River Darent, tributaries of the River Medway, and on the River Stour. Two 18th century mills were on the River Len and at Tovil on the River Loose. In the late 19th century huge modern mills were built at Dartford and Northfleet on the River Thames and at Kemsley on The Swale. In pre-industrial times, almost every village and town had its own windmill or watermill, with over 400 windmills known to have stood at some time. Twenty-eight survive within the county today, plus two replica mills and a further two in that part of Kent now absorbed into London. All the major rivers in the county were used to power watermills.

From about 1900, several coal pits operated in East Kent. The Kent Coalfield was mined during the 20th century at several collieries, including Chislet, Tilmanstone, Betteshanger, and the Snowdown Colliery, which ran from 1908 to 1986.

The west of the county (including Tunbridge Wells, Tonbridge, and Sevenoaks) has less than 50% of the average claimant count for low incomes or worklessness as the coastal districts of Dover, Folkestone and Hythe, and Thanet (chiefly three resorts: Ramsgate, Broadstairs, and Margate). West and Central Kent have long had many City of London commuters.

Culture

Architecture

Kent's geographical location between the Straits of Dover and London has influenced its architecture, as has its Cretaceous geology and its good farming land and fine building clays. Kent's countryside pattern was determined by a gavelkind inheritance system that generated a proliferation of small settlements. There was no open-field system, and the large tracts were owned by the two great abbeys, Christ Church, Canterbury and St Augustine's Abbey, that did not pass into the hands of the king during the Reformation. Canterbury Cathedral is the United Kingdom's metropolitan cathedral; it was founded in AD 598 and displays architecture from all periods. There are nine Anglo-Saxon churches in Kent. Rochester Cathedral is England's second-oldest cathedral, the present building built in the Early English Style. These two dioceses ensured that every village had a parish church.

The sites of Richborough Castle and Dover Castle, along with two strategic sites along Watling Street, were fortified by the Romans and the Dukes of Kent. Other important sites include Canterbury city walls and Rochester Castle. There remained a need to defend London and thus Kent. Deal Castle, Walmer Castle, Sandown Castle (whose remains were eroded by the sea in the 1990s) were constructed in late mediaeval times, and HM Dockyard, at Chatham and its surrounding castles and forts—Upnor Castle, Great Lines, and Fort Amherst—more recently.

Kent has three unique vernacular architecture forms: the oast house, the Wealden hall house, and Kentish peg-tiles.

Kent has bridge trusts to maintain its bridges, and though the great bridge (1387) at Rochester was replaced there are medieval structures at Aylesford, Yalding and Teston. With the motorways in the late twentieth century came the M2 motorway bridge spanning the Medway and the Dartford tunnel and the Dartford Bridge spanning the Thames.

Literature and publishing
Kent has provided inspiration for several notable writers and artists. Canterbury's religious role gave rise to Chaucer's Canterbury Tales, a key development in the English language. The father of novelist Charles Dickens worked at the Chatham Dockyard; in many of his books, the celebrated novelist featured the scenery of Chatham, Rochester, and the Cliffe marshes. During the late 1930s, Nobel Prize-awarded novelist William Golding worked as a teacher at Maidstone Grammar School, where he met his future wife Ann Brookfield. William Caxton, who first introduced the printing press to England, was born in Kent; the recent invention was key in helping many Kent dialect words and spellings to become standard in English. Lord Northbourne hosted a biodynamic agriculture conference on his estate at Betteshanger in the summer of 1939, he coined the term 'organic farming' and published his manifesto of organic agriculture the following year spawning a global movement for sustainable agriculture and food.

Visual arts
A number of significant artists came from Kent, including Thomas Sidney Cooper, a painter of landscapes, often incorporating farm animals, Richard Dadd, a maker of faery paintings, and Mary Tourtel, the creator of the children's book character, Rupert Bear. The artist Clive Head was also born in Kent. The landscape painter J. M. W. Turner spent part of his childhood in the town of Margate in East Kent, and regularly returned to visit it throughout his life. The East Kent coast inspired many of his works, including some of his most famous seascapes. Kent has also been the home to artists including Frank Auerbach, Tracey Emin and Stass Paraskos.

Kent was also the location of the largest number of art schools in the country during the nineteenth century, estimated by the art historian David Haste, to approach two hundred. This is believed to be the result of Kent being a front line county during the Napoleonic Wars. At this time, before the invention of photography, draughtsmen were used to draw maps and topographical representations of the fields of battle, and after the wars ended many of these settled permanently in the county in which they had been based. Once the idea of art schools had been established, even in small towns in Kent, the tradition continued, although most of the schools were very small one-man operations, each teaching a small number of daughters of the upper classes how to draw and make watercolour paintings. Nonetheless, some of these small art schools developed into much larger organisations, including Canterbury College of Art, founded by Thomas Sidney Cooper in 1868, which is today the University for the Creative Arts.

Blean near Canterbury was home to Smallfilms, the production company founded by Oliver Postgate and Peter Firmin and responsible for children's TV favourites Noggin the Nog, Ivor the Engine and Bagpuss.

Performing arts
The county's largest theatre is the Marlowe Theatre in the centre of Canterbury.

Music festivals that take place in Kent include Chilled in a Field Festival, Electric Gardens, Hop Farm Festival, In the Woods Festival, Lounge On The Farm and the annual Smugglers Festival near Deal. Other venues for live music include Leas Cliff Hall in Folkestone and the Assembly Hall in Tunbridge Wells.

Kentish independence 
Kentish people have long viewed themselves as Kentish first and British second, and to this day refer to themselves as either 'Men of Kent' or 'Kentish men' depending on whether they live to the East or West of the River Medway. After the 2016 Brexit referendum and subsequent proposals for "border checks" on the Kentish border, effectively making Kent a country within a country, this pride in being Kentish began to form into calls from some areas for an independent Kent or an autonomous republic within the UK, especially from the county's prominent newspapers, with the idea being discussed in detail in some areas - with some ideas such as mock passports and "tongue-in-cheek" manifestos being created. These calls for independence can be explained by the individualistic and rebellious mentality that has always existed in the county, which can be explained by the counties position in the very South-East of the United Kingdom, having been a prominent and independent kingdom for centuries as well as being the source of many major rebellions that have occurred in the United Kingdom.

Transport

Roads

With the Roman invasion, a road network was constructed to connect London to the Channel ports of Dover, Lympne and Richborough. The London–Dover road was Watling Street. These roads are now approximately the A2, B2068, A257, and the A28. The A2 runs through Dartford (A207), Gravesend, Rochester, Canterbury, and Dover; the A20 through Eltham, Wrotham, Maidstone, Charing, Ashford. Hythe, Folkestone and Dover; the A21 around Sevenoaks, Tonbridge, Tunbridge Wells and on to Hastings in East Sussex. In the 1960s, two motorways were built; the M2 from Medway to Faversham, and the M20 from Swanley to Folkestone. Part of the M25 runs through Kent, from Westerham to the Dartford Crossing. The M26 motorway, built in 1980, provides a short link between the M25 at Sevenoaks and the M20 near Wrotham. Kent currently has more motorways by distance than any other county in the UK, with sections of the M2, M20, M25 and M26 totalling  within the extents of the ceremonial county.

In the run-up to Britain leaving the European Union, Government minister Michael Gove confirmed that the Government intended to impose a de facto border between Kent and the rest of England for freight lorries, in order to deal with expected lorry queues of 7,000 or more at Folkestone, Dover and other ports. Heavy goods vehicle operators need to apply for a 24-hour Kent Access Permit (KAP) to take a vehicle of 7.5 tonnes or more into Kent if their intention is to cross to the EU via Dover or the Eurotunnel.

Water
The medieval Cinque Ports, except for the Port of Dover, have all now silted up. The Medway Estuary has been an important port and naval base for 500 years. The River Medway is tidal up to Allington and navigable up to Tonbridge. Kent's two canals are the Royal Military Canal between Hythe and Rye, which still exists, and the Thames and Medway Canal between Strood and Gravesend. Built-in 1824, it was purchased in 1846 by the railways, which partially backfilled it. Container ports are at Ramsgate and Thamesport. Following the closures across the lower Medway, and the Swale to the Isle of Sheppey, during the 20th century, the Woolwich Ferry is the only domestic ferry that runs in the broadest definition of the county.

Railways

The earliest locomotive-driven passenger-carrying railway in Britain was the Canterbury & Whitstable Railway which opened in 1830. This and the London & Greenwich Railway later merged into South Eastern Railway (SER).
By the 1850s, SER's networks had expanded to Ashford, Ramsgate, Canterbury, Tunbridge Wells, and the Medway towns. SER's major London termini were London Bridge, Charing Cross, and Cannon Street. Kent also had a second major railway, the London, Chatham & Dover Railway. Originally the East Kent Railway in 1858, it linked the northeast Kent coast with London terminals at Victoria and Blackfriars.

The two companies merged in 1899, forming the South Eastern & Chatham Railway, further amalgamated with other railways by the Railways Act 1921 to form the Southern Railway. Britain's railways were nationalised in 1948, forming British Railways. The railways were privatised in 1996 and most Kent passenger services were franchised to Connex South Eastern. Following financial difficulties, Connex lost the franchise and was replaced by South Eastern Trains and after Southeastern.

The Channel Tunnel was completed in 1994 and High Speed 1 in November 2007 with a London terminus at St Pancras. A new station, Ebbsfleet International, opened between Dartford and Gravesend, serving northern Kent. The high speed lines will be utilised to provide a faster train service to coastal towns like Ramsgate and Folkestone. This station is in addition to the existing station at Ashford International, which has suffered a massive cut in service as a result.

In addition to the "main line" railways, there are several light, heritage, and industrial railways in Kent. There are three heritage, standard gauge railways; Spa Valley Railway near Tunbridge Wells on the old Tunbridge Wells West branch, East Kent Railway on the old East Kent coalfield area and the Kent & East Sussex Railway on the Weald around Tenterden. In addition, there is the  gauge, Romney, Hythe & Dymchurch Railway on the southeast Kent coast along the Dungeness peninsula.

Air
Charter flights are provided by Lydd Airport at Lydd.

In 2002, it was revealed that the government was considering building a new four-runway airport on the marshland near the village of Cliffe on Hoo Peninsula. This plan was dropped in 2003 following protests by cultural and environmental groups. However further plans for a Thames Estuary Airport on the Kent coast have subsequently emerged, including the Thames Hub Airport, again sited on the Isle of Grain and designed by Lord Foster, and the London Britannia Airport plan, colloquially known as "Boris Island" due to its being championed by the former Mayor of London Boris Johnson, which would see a six runway airport built on an artificial island to be towards the Shivering Sands area, north-east of Whitstable.
Both of these options were dropped in 2014 in favour of expansion at either Gatwick or Heathrow Airport, the latter finally being the chosen option following Theresa May's installation as Prime Minister in summer 2016.

Manston Airport, located near the village of Manston in the Thanet district, was a former RAF facility that also handled some civilian flights. It closed in 2014.

Education

Kent has four universities: Canterbury Christ Church University with campuses throughout East Kent; University of Kent, with campuses in Canterbury and Medway; University of Greenwich (a London University), with sites at Woolwich, Eltham, London and Medway; the University for the Creative Arts (UCA) also has three of its five campuses in the county.

Although much of Britain adopted a comprehensive education system in the 1970s, Kent County Council (KCC) and Medway Unitary Authority are among around fifteen
local authorities still providing wholly selective education through the eleven-plus examination with students allocated a place at a secondary modern school or at a grammar school.

Together, the two Kent authorities have 38 of the 164 grammar schools remaining in Britain.

Kent County Council has the largest education department of any local council in Britain,
providing school places for over 289,000 pupils.

In 2005–06, Kent County Council and Medway introduced a standardised school year, based on six terms, as recommended by the Local Government Association in its 2000 report, "The Rhythms of Schooling".

Kent County Council Local Education Authority maintains 96 secondary schools, of which 33 are selective schools and 63 are secondary modern schools.

Music education is provided by Kent Music (formerly Kent Music School), which has its origins in the 1940s. Kent Music provides services across the county including Kent County Youth Orchestra, Kent Youth Choirs, and an annual summer school at Benenden School.

National Challenge schools
In 2010, Kent had the highest number of National Challenge schools in England: schools which are branded 'failing' based on the British Government's floor targets that 30% of pupils achieve at least 5 GCSE grades A* to C. Of the 63 secondary modern schools, 33 missed this target; thus 52% of Kent secondary modern schools (34% out of all 96 maintained secondary schools) are 'failing'.

Sport

In association football, Kent's highest ranked football team is Gillingham FC (nicknamed 'The Gills') who play in Football League Two, having been demoted at the end of the 2021-22 season. Maidstone United was a Football League side from 1989 until going bankrupt in 1992. Kent clubs in the higher levels of non-league football include the current incarnation of Maidstone United and Dover Athletic playing in the National League along with Ebbsfleet United, who were promoted in 2017. Dartford currently play in National League South, the sixth tier of the English football pyramid.

Kent is represented in cricket by Kent County Cricket Club. The club was a founder member of the County Championship in 1890 and has won the competition, the major domestic first-class cricket competition, seven times. The club is based at the St Lawrence Ground in Canterbury and also plays matches at the Nevill Ground in Royal Tunbridge Wells and the County Cricket Ground, Beckenham. The Kent Women cricket team has won the Women's County Championship seven times since it was established in 1997. Cricket has traditionally been a popular sport in the county and Kent is considered one of the locations in which the game first developed. Teams have represented the county since the early 18th century. The Kent Cricket League is the top level of club competition within Kent and features teams from throughout the county, including areas such as Beckenham and Bexley which were formerly part of the county.

Canterbury Hockey Club and Holcombe Hockey Club both play in the top division in both the men's and women's England Hockey Leagues. Sevenoaks Hockey Club's women first XI plays in the second tier of national competition.

In rugby union, Tonbridge Juddians and Canterbury RFC play in the fourth-tier of English rugby in the National League 2 South. Gravesend RFC play in the seventh-tier London 2 South-East. Blackheath FC, a club within the historic boundaries of the county, play in fourth-tier National League 2 South. Both Tonbridge Juddians and Blackheath RFC played in National league 1 (the third-tier of English rugby) up until the end of the 2021-2022 season.

In motorsport, the Brands Hatch circuit near Swanley has played host to a number of national and international racing events and hosted 12 runnings of the British Grand Prix in various years between 1964 and 1986.

Kent is home to two National League netball clubs, both based in northwest Kent:  Telstars (Premier Division 2) and KCNC (Premier Division 3).

The 2021-2022 season has seen three Kentish clubs demoted from the third-tier of their respective sports to the fourth-tier, with rugby clubs Tonbridge Juddians and Blackheath RFC being demoted in rugby and Gillingham FC being demoted in football.

News and media

Television

Much of Kent is served by the BBC's South East region, which is based in Tunbridge Wells and provides local news for the county and East Sussex. Its commercial rival is ITV Meridian Ltd, which has a newsroom at The Maidstone Studios despite the main studio being based in Hampshire. Main transmitters providing these services are at West Hougham, near Dover and Blue Bell Hill, between Chatham and Maidstone. A powerful relay transmitter at Tunbridge Wells serves the town and surrounding area. Those parts of Kent closest to London such as Swanley, Westerham, Dartford, Gravesend, and Sevenoaks lie within the ITV London and BBC London areas, taking their television signals from the Crystal Palace transmitter.

Radio
Kent has two county-wide stations – BBC Radio Kent, based in Tunbridge Wells; and the commercial station KMFM, owned by the KM Group. KMFM previously consisted of seven local stations which covered different areas of the county (and are still technically seven different licences) but have shared all programming since 2012

The county's first commercial station was originally known as Invicta FM and began broadcasting in 1984. After various buyouts, the station was rebranded into Heart Kent in 2009 as part of the Heart Network. The station was closed and merged with several other Heart stations in the south of England in 2019 to form Heart South, with the Kent studios in Whitstable closing and production moving to Fareham in Hampshire.

There are several community radio stations in Kent including:

 Academy FM (Folkestone).
 Academy FM (Thanet)
 Ashford FM (Ashford) on 107.1 FM.
 BRFM 95.6 FM (Sheppey)
 Cabin FM broadcasting to Herne Bay on 94.6FM.
 Cinque Ports Radio 100.2FM for Romney Marsh, Rye and Hythe.
 CSR 97.4FM (Canterbury) now only available via online listening.
 Deal Radio (Deal): online only.
 Dover Community Radio (DCR) Dover: currently online only; due to start broadcasting to Dover District on 104.9FM from May 2022.
 Radio Faversham (Faversham): online only.
 Maidstone Community Radio (MCR): online only.
 Miskin Radio (Dartford and Gravesend): online only.
 SFM 106.9FM (Sittingboune)
 Sheppey FM 92.2 (Sheppey)
 Shoreline Easy (Romney Marsh), online only.
 West Kent Radio (WKCR) serving Tonbridge, Tunbridge Wells and Sevenoaks. 95.5 and 106.7FM.
 Whitstable Bay Radio (Whitstable): online only.

Newspapers
The KM Group, KOS Media and Kent Regional News and Media all provide local newspapers for most of the large towns and cities. County-wide papers include the Kent Messenger, Kent on Saturday, Kent on Sunday, and the Kent and Sussex Courier.

See also

 Custos Rotulorum of Kent – list of Keepers of the Rolls
 Duke of Kent
 Kent (UK Parliament constituency) – historical list of MPs for Kent constituency
 Kent Community Network
 Kent Police and Crime Commissioner
 List of churches in Kent
 List of civil parishes in Kent
 List of fire stations in Kent
 List of hills of Kent
 List of Lord Lieutenants
 List of people from Kent
 List of places in Kent
 List of tourist attractions in Kent
 Recreational walks in Kent
 Thames Gateway – includes details of regeneration projects in the northern areas of Kent
 :Category:Towns in Kent
 :Category:Villages in Kent
 Fergus and Judith Wilson

References

External links

 
 Kent County Council – local government website
 BBC – origins of Kent placenames
 Images of Kent at the English Heritage Archive

 
Non-metropolitan counties
South East England
Home counties
Counties of England established in antiquity